Sport Club Americano, commonly known as Americano, was a Brazilian football club from Santos, São Paulo state. They won the Campeonato Paulista twice.

History
The club was founded on May 21, 1903. From 1911 to 1916, Americano did not lose a single game, they played 23 games, won 15 and drew the other eight. They won the Campeonato Paulista in 1912, and in 1913. After competing in the Campeonato Paulista for the last time in 1916, the club stopped its activities.

Honours
 Campeonato Paulista (2): 1912, 1913

Stadium

Sport Club Americano played their home games at Velódromo Paulistano. The stadium had a maximum capacity of 10,000 people.

References

Association football clubs established in 1903
Association football clubs disestablished in 1916
Defunct football clubs in São Paulo (state)
1903 establishments in Brazil
1916 disestablishments in Brazil